Jenny Holzer’s Truisms (1977–1979) are some of her best-known works. The nearly 300 aphorisms and slogans utilize a series of modern clichés or commonly held truths.

Conception and execution 

Holzer started investigating the use of words and language as an art medium in itself while she was studying literature and philosophy in New York City in 1977. She began simplifying big ideas from her readings into concise statements and phrases and putting up signs around Manhattan. As opposed to contemporaries like Barbara Kruger, Louise Lawler, or Richard Prince, Holzer considered the text the image in itself, whereas they combined text with imagery. She appreciated the immediacy and the reaching of wide-scale audiences that signage provided. Holzer placed the finished products in telephone booths or on the walls of buildings, eventually shifting to bigger projects, like her installations in Times Square. She claimed that she wrote all her own clichés, thinking that if people heard something that was a little different than usual that they would remember it more clearly. She liked to keep her statements as short and concise as possible, so as to reach the largest crowd possible. “You only have a few seconds to catch people, so you can’t do long, reasoned arguments, [but] I hope they’re not simplistic or idiotic”, Holzer said on the topic. Her goal was for people to see them, read them, laugh at them, and be provoked by them.

Electronic displays 

Ned Rifkin, the chief curator for exhibitions at the Hirshhorn, calls Holzer’s work “very American” in the sense of her being at ease with technology and impatient with tradition. “I like the aggressiveness and the kind of futuristic beauty of the electronics,” Holzer said. Because of this dependence on words and electronics, her series was called “specialist art” in 1988.

Reception 

When Holzer displayed her Truisms, “she brought her disquieting messages to a new height of subversive social engagement.” Using mass media to exhibit her work, placing her grave texts where everyday advertising is expected, creates a new, large audience for her work: an audience of the general public who would not, under average circumstances, give modern and contemporary art a second thought. She hoped that with their prominent and public location, her Truisms would make people more aware of what she called the “usual baloney they are fed” in daily life.

Notes

References
 Tate Modern, Truisms, gallery label, October 2000.
 
 
 Smith, Roberta. “ART IN REVIEW; Jenny Holzer -- Protect Me From What I Want.” New York Times (September 6, 2002).
 Holzer, Jenny. “Jenny Holzer’s Public Clichés.” San Francisco Museum of Modern Art.
 
 Guggenheim Museum. “Untitled (Selections from Truisms, Inflammatory Essays, The Living Series, The Survival Series, Under a Rock, Laments, and Child Text).” 1989.
 Museum of Modern Art. Jenny Holzer’s Truisms. 1978-87.

Works by Jenny Holzer